James Thomas Tilyard (27 August 1889 – 1 November 1966) was a New Zealand rugby union player.

Tilyard, Australian born, represented Wellington and Wanganui provincially. He played his club rugby with Poneke. A brother, Fred, was also an All Black while other brothers competed in club rugby at a high level.

He played his only Test match for New Zealand when he took the field as a first five-eighth in an 11-point loss to Australia at Christchurch in 1913. It was more of a second string All-Blacks team as the usual players had already started their tour of Canada when this Test, the final of the series, was played.

Tilyard returned to the national team in 1920 and captained them for a tour of New South Wales. He made nine All Black appearances on the tour, scored four tries and kicked two conversions as well as a drop goal.

The talented sportsman also appeared in one first-class cricket match for Wellington in 1908, against Hawke's Bay in Napier. In a drawn match, Tilyard contributed scores of 31 and nine.

References

1889 births
1966 deaths
People from Tasmania
Australian emigrants to New Zealand
New Zealand rugby union players
New Zealand international rugby union players
Wellington rugby union players
Wanganui rugby union players
Rugby union fly-halves
New Zealand cricketers
Wellington cricketers
Rugby union players from Tasmania